Abu 'Abd Allah Jamal al-Din Muḥammad ibn Abd Allāh ibn Malik al-Ta'i al-Jayyani ( 600 AH – 672 AH / 1203-4 or 1204-5 – 21 February 1274) was an Arab grammarian born in Jaén. After leaving al-Andalus for the Near East,  and taught Arabic language and literature in Aleppo and Hamāt, before eventually settled in Damascus, where he began the most productive period of his life. He was a senior master at the Adiliyya Madrasa. His reputation in Arabic literature was cemented by his al-Khulāsa al-alfiyya (known also as simply Alfiya), a versification of Arabic grammar, for which at least 43 commentaries have been written.

References

Sources
Fleisch, H. "Ibn Mālik" in The Encyclopaedia of Islam, 2nd Edition. CD-ROM Edition, Version 1.0. (Leiden: Brill, 1999).

External links

Arab grammarians
Medieval grammarians of Arabic
Grammarians of Arabic
1200s births
1274 deaths
People from Jaén, Spain
13th-century Arabs